The Emancipation and Freedom Monument on Brown's Island, Richmond, Virginia, is a public statue installed on September 22, 2021. The monument includes two  bronze statues of an emancipated man and woman with an infant. The woman is holding a piece of paper with the date January 1, 1863 which corresponds with the day U.S. president Abraham Lincoln issued the Emancipation Proclamation.

The monument was designed by Oregon sculptor Thomas Jay Warren. Virginia senator Jennifer McClellan led the commissioning of the statue. According to McClellan, "it's the first state-funded statue celebrating emancipation in the U.S."

Composition 
The pedestal features the names, photos, and stories of ten Virginians who participated involved both before and after emancipation.

Pre-emancipation 

 Mary Bowser, former slave and Union spy during the Civil War
 William Harvey Carney, soldier and former slave
 Gabriel, enslaved blacksmith and rebellion leader
 Dred Scott, enslaved man and plaintiff of Dred Scott v. Sandford
 Nat Turner, enslaved preacher and rebellion leader

Post-emancipation 

 Rosa Dixon Bowser, educator and women's rights activist
 John Mercer Langston, politician and academic administrator
 John Mitchell Jr., community activist, newspaper editor, and political candidate 
 Lucy F. Simms, educator
 Wyatt Tee Walker, civil rights activist and reverend

Gallery

See also 

 List of monuments to African Americans

References

External links

 

2021 sculptures
Bronze sculptures in Virginia
Monuments and memorials to victims of slavery in the United States
Outdoor sculptures in Richmond, Virginia
Sculptures of African Americans
Sculptures of children in the United States
Sculptures of men in Virginia
Sculptures of women in Virginia
Statues in Virginia